Brad Gilbert was the defending champion but lost in the second round to Cristiano Caratti.

Derrick Rostagno won in the final 6–3, 6–3 against Todd Woodbridge.

Seeds
A champion seed is indicated in bold text while text in italics indicates the round in which that seed was eliminated. The top eight seeds received a bye to the second round.

  Ivan Lendl (second round)
  Andrés Gómez (third round)
  Brad Gilbert (second round)
  Michael Chang (second round)
  Andrei Chesnokov (semifinals)
  Goran Ivanišević (second round)
  Jonas Svensson (third round)
  Tim Mayotte (second round)
  Richard Fromberg (second round)
  Petr Korda (first round)
  Wally Masur (quarterfinals)
  Jim Grabb (third round)
  Amos Mansdorf (third round)
  Mats Wilander (first round)
  David Wheaton (second round)
  Christo van Rensburg (third round)

Draw

Finals

Top half

Section 1

Section 2

Bottom half

Section 3

Section 4

References
 1990 Volvo International Draw (Archived 2009-06-15)

Singles